Kornelija Sertić was the first woman to graduate from the School of Medicine in Zagreb, in 1923. The school opened in 1917.

Early life 
Sertić was born in the Croatian town of Sveti Ivan Zelina (at that time a part of Austro-Hungarian Monarchy). She studied at the Medical Faculty in Graz in 1917. She graduated on 30 November 1923.

Career 
Sertić specialized in pediatrics in Zagreb. She became a specialist in tuberculosis and lung diseases, which, at the time, was common in southeastern Europe.

Personal life 
In 1932, Sertić married her colleague, pulmonologist and tuberculosis specialist, Stanko Ibler. During World War II she was imprisoned by the Gestapo.  She died in 1988.

References

Croatian pediatricians
20th-century women physicians
University of Zagreb alumni
1988 deaths
Croatian pulmonologists
Year of birth missing
Place of death missing
Date of death missing
Women pediatricians
20th-century Croatian women